The House Detox is a South Korea reality show program on tvN with Shin Ae-ra, Park Na-rae and Yoon Kyun-sang as the hosts. The show airs on tvN every Monday at 22:35 (KST) starting from June 29, 2020, and ended on July 6, 2021.

Synopsis
In each episode, the 3 hosts visit different celebrities' houses to help in tidying up the houses.

Episodes

2020

2021

Ratings
 Ratings listed below are the individual corner ratings of The House Detox. (Note: Individual corner ratings do not include commercial time, which regular ratings include.)

2020

2021

References

External links 
 Official website 

South Korean reality television series
2020 South Korean television series debuts
Korean-language television shows
South Korean television shows
2021 South Korean television series endings